A drainage tunnel, called an emissary in ancient contexts, is a tunnel or channel created to drain water, often from a stagnant or variable-depth body of water. It typically leads to a lower stream or river, or to a location where a pumping station can be economically run.  Drainage tunnels have frequently been constructed to drain mining districts or to serve drainage districts.

Etymology
Emissary comes from Latin emissarium, from ex and mittere 'to send out'.

Ancient world

The most remarkable emissaries carry off the waters of lakes surrounded by hills.

In ancient Greece, the waters of Lake Copais were drained into the Cephisus; they were partly natural and partly artificial. In 480 BC, Phaeax built drains at Agrigentum in Sicily: they were admired for their sheer size, although the workmanship was crude.

The ancient Romans excelled in the construction of emissaries, as in all their hydraulic works, and remains are extant showing that lakes Trasimeno, Albano and Nemi were all drained by means of emissaries. The case of Lake Fucino is remarkable in two ways: the attempt to drain it was one of the rare failures of Roman engineering, and the emissary is now completely above ground and open to inspection. Julius Caesar is said to have first conceived the idea of this stupendous undertaking  (Suet. Jul. 44); with the tunnels that bring his name, Claudius inaugurated what was to have been a complete drainage scheme (Tac. Ann. xii.57), but the water level dropped by just 4 meters and stabilized, leaving the lake very much there. Hadrian tried it again, but failed; and it was not until 1878 that Lake Fucino was finally drained.

The initial text of this section was an abridgment from Smith's Dictionary of Greek and Roman Antiquities (1875 edition, public domain).

Modern examples
Modern examples of drainage tunnels include the Emisor Oriente Tunnel near Mexico City as well as the Tunnel and Reservoir Plan in Chicago.

See also
Storm drain

External links
Emissarium, the full article in Smith's Dictionary
 Walter Dragoni, Costanza Cambi, Field Trip Guidebook for "Hydraulic Structures in Ancient Rome", field trip of the 42nd Congress of the International Association of Hydrogeologists, Rome, September 2015. full text

 
Flood control
Roman aqueducts
Ancient Roman architectural elements
Hydraulic engineering